Kristín Helga Gunnarsdóttir (born 24 November 1963) is an Icelandic writer, columnist and novelist and environmental activist. Three time winner of the Icelandic Women´s literature award and the Reykjavík City Children's Book Award and nominated for the Nordic Council Literature Award in 2019. She is best known for her series of children's books on the character Fíasól, also published in Russian 2019. She has also written for theatre, radio and television. Kristín Helga is a journalist and a former reporter and a newscaster for an Icelandic TV channel Stöð 2 and on the radio. She studied journalism and Spanish at the University of Utah, along with Spanish studies at the University of Iceland and at the University of Barcelona.

Published works

Novels 
The titles are in Icelandic:
1997 Elsku besta Binna mín
1998 Bíttu á jaxlinn Binna mín
1998 Keikó hvalur í heimsreisu
1999 Milljón steinar og Hrollur í dalnum
2000 Mói hrekkjusvín
2001 Í Mánaljósi
2002 Gallsteinar afa Gissa
2003 Strandanornir
2003 Loftur og gullfuglarnir
2004 Fíasól í fínum málum
2005 Fíasól í hosiló
2006 Fíasól á flandri
2007 Draugaslóð
2008 Fíasól er flottust
2009 Láki Máni og þjóðahyskið
2010 Fíasól og litla ljónaránið
2010 Fíasól - play, National theater of Iceland
2011 Ríólítreglan
2012  Grímsævintýri" ævisaga hunds
2013  Mói hrekkjusvín-kúreki í Arisóna
2013  Láki Máni og letikeppurinn
2014  Mói hrekkjusvín- misskildir snillingar
2014  Láki Máni og montrassinn
2015  Landsmót hrekkjusvína
2015  Litlar byltingar
2016  Gallsteinar afa Gissa, útvarpsleikrit/RUV radio play
2017   "Gallsteinar afa Gissa," Stage play- musical. Akureyri Theater company
2018   " Vertu Ósýnilegur- Flóttasaga Ishmaels" novel/ a refugee´s story (YA)
2019   " Fjallaverksmiðja Íslands" The Mountain Factory, novel ( YA)
2020   " Fiasol and a bizarre story of a kid with a cat in his tummy
2021   " Ótemjur"-"Untamed", novel (YA)

Awards
 A million stones and Willy in the valley, nominated for the Youngster ́s book award of Reykjavík city council, 2000
 Town artist of the year, Garðabær town council, 2000
 Moe the mischief, Reykjavík City Children's Literature Prize, 2001
 In the Moonlight, Children ́s book award, 2002, chosen by children library visitors
 Witches of the shore, Children's book award, 2004, children library visitors
 Witches of the shore, Icelandic IBBY award, 2004, International Board on Books for Young people
 Fíasól in the nook, Children’s book award, 2006
 Fíasól, the wanderer, Children´s book award, 2007
 Ghost trail, Westnordic Children´s Literature Award, 2008
 Red hat, short story, 2nd place in a ghost story competition, Reykjavík 2008
 Ghost trail, nominated for the Nordic children’s literature prize, 2009
 Fíasól - the greatest, Children ́s book award, 2009
 Story stone of IBBY 2009 - International Board on books for young people. Awarded for career.
 Fíasól, play for the National Theater of Iceland- nominated for the best stage play for children 2010
 Grissom Adventure - a dog´s true life story, nominated for Women´s Book Award, 2013
 Be invisible- a refugee story, Women´s book award 2019, Reykjavík book award 2019, nominated for Nordic Council Book award 2019
 typpa verðlaun- a typpa story, women´s book award 2021, Reykjavík book award 2021, nominated for Russian Council book award 2021

References

External links
Icelandic Literature Web: Kristín Helga Gunnarsdóttir
Interviews with Icelandic Authors: Kristín Helga Gunnarsdóttir, Icelandic Literature Center

1963 births
Living people
Kristin Helga Gunnarsdottir
Kristin Helga Gunnarsdottir
Icelandic women children's writers